Eubranchipus vernalis, known generally as the eastern fairy shrimp or springtime fairy shrimp, is a species of brine shrimp or fairy shrimp in the family Chirocephalidae. It is found in North America.

References

Anostraca
Crustaceans described in 1869